Immigration Tango is a 2010 American comedy film directed by David Burton Morris and written by Martin L. Kelley, Robert J. Lee, Todd Norwood and Elika Portnoy. The film stars Elika Portnoy, McCaleb Burnett, Carlos Leon, Ashley Wolfe, Avery Sommers, and Beth Glover. The film was released on February 18, 2011, by Roadside Attractions.

Cast
 Elika Portnoy as Elena Dubrovnik
 McCaleb Burnett as Mike White
 Carlos Leon as Carlos Sanchez
 Ashley Wolfe as Betty Bristol
 Avery Sommers as Ms. Ravencourt
 Beth Glover as Jill White
 Steve DuMouchel as Harold White
 Kristen Dawn McCorkell as Sarah White
 Brett Golov as Mr. Geneva

Release
The film was released on February 18, 2011, by Roadside Attractions.

References

External links
 

2010 films
2010 comedy films
American comedy films
Roadside Attractions films
2010s English-language films
Films directed by David Burton Morris
2010s American films